Elipsocus coloripennis is a species of psocopteran from the Elipsocidae family. It is endemic to the Canary Islands.

References

Elipsocidae
Psocoptera of Europe
Endemic insects of the Canary Islands
Insects described in 1996